Scolytus rugulosus, known generally as shothole borer, is a species of typical bark beetle in the family Curculionidae. Other common names include the fruit tree bark beetle and apple tree beetle. It is found in North America and Europe.

References

Further reading

External links

 

Scolytinae
Articles created by Qbugbot
Beetles described in 1818